Guilin Road is an interchange station between Line 9 and Line 15 of the Shanghai Metro.

When the line opened on 29 December 2007, it was the eastern terminus of Line 9, with a shuttle bus providing a link between this station and Yishan Road station. On 28 December 2008, the extension to Yishan Road was opened and the shuttle bus service was removed.

The line 9 platforms have 3 tracks, one island platform, and one side platform. The inner island platform is not in service. Trains heading to Caolu use the outer island platform, whilst trains towards Songjiang South Railway Station use the side platform. The line 9 platform utilizes the same platform layout as Zhongchun Road on the same line.
The line 15 island platform opened on 27 June 2021 in together with the opening of the transfer between the 2 lines.

Station Layout

References

External links

Railway stations in Shanghai
Line 9, Shanghai Metro
Line 15, Shanghai Metro
Shanghai Metro stations in Xuhui District
Railway stations in China opened in 2007